The Macariini are a tribe of geometer moths in the subfamily Ennominae. Though they share many traits with the Sterrhinae, this is probably plesiomorphic rather than indicative of a close relationship, and DNA sequence data points to the Boarmiini as particularly close relatives of the Macariini. All things considered, this tribe might still resemble the first Ennominae more than any other living lineage in the subfamily.

Selected genera and species

As numerous ennominae genera have not yet been assigned to a tribe, the genus list should be considered preliminary.
 Acanthovalva
 Aporhoptrina
 Chiasmia
 Digrammia
 Dissomorphia
 Elpiste
 Epelis
 Eumacaria
 Fernaldella
 Gnopharmia
 Godonela
 Heliomata - might belong in Abraxini (Cassymini if distinct)
 Heterocallia
 Hypephyra
 Isturgia
 Frosted yellow, Isturgia limbaria
 Itame
 Letispe
 Luxiaria
 Macaria
 Mellilla
 Milocera
 Monocerotesa - might belong in Boarmiini
 Narraga 
 Neritodes (tentatively placed here)
 Oxymacaria
 Parosteodes
 Phyle
 Plateoplia 
 Platypepla 
 Psamatodes
 Pygmaena
 Rectopis
 Rindgea
 Rhoptria
 Semiothisa – includes Chiasmia and Macaria
 Latticed heath, Semiothisa clathrata
 Speranza
 Tephrina
 Trigrammia

In addition, "Boarmia" penthearia appears to belong to the Macariini too.

Footnotes

References

  (2008): Family group names in Geometridae. Retrieved 22 July 2008.
  (2008): Markku Savela's Lepidoptera and some other life forms: Ennominae. Version of 8 March 2008. Retrieved 21 July 2008.
  (2008): Characterisation of the Australian Nacophorini using adult morphology, and phylogeny of the Geometridae based on morphological characters. Zootaxa 1736: 1-141. PDF abstract and excerpt